Lonnie Poole Golf Course is an 18-hole public golf course located on the campus of North Carolina State University in Raleigh, North Carolina, USA.

Development and funding
The Lonnie Poole Golf Course was designed by Arnold Palmer and the design team at Arnold Palmer Design Company. It was the only collegiate course ever designed by Arnold Palmer.

The course is named for Lonnie Poole Jr., NC State alum and founder of Waste Industries. Poole and his wife provided a naming gift to fund the golf course as well as a lead gift for the clubhouse construction. Other donors from the NC State community have also contributed to the development of the clubhouse and practice facilities, which was built solely on private donations.

Operation
The purpose of the facility is to provide a public golf course on the Centennial Campus of NC State University that serves as a venue for the men’s and women's golf teams. It also facilitates turfgrass and stormwater research associated with the College of Agriculture and Life Sciences (CALS). The golf course also serves as a teaching and training facility for the Professional Golf Management (PGM) Program in the College of Natural Resources.

Recognition
The course has received a number of recognitions, notable ones include:

 Certified Silver Audubon International Sanctuary (1 of 2 certified college courses)
 2009-10 Top 40 New Courses – Golfweek Magazine
 2016-2019 Best Golf Course in Raleigh – Midtown Magazine
 2016-2019 #1 Public Golf Course in Raleigh – NC Golf Panel
 2019 #1 Public Course in the Triangle for Best Practice Facilities – NC Golf Panel
 2019 Sustainability Award - NC Golf Owners Association

References

External links 
 Official site

North Carolina State University
College golf clubs and courses in the United States
Sports venues in Raleigh, North Carolina
NC State Wolfpack sports venues
Research Triangle
Golf clubs and courses in North Carolina
2008 establishments in North Carolina